Ken Fec, known by his stage name Power Pill Fist, is an Atari noise rock artist from Pittsburgh, PA. He was the bassist for the experimental band Black Moth Super Rainbow from its beginnings in 1999 to 2009. Beginning in 2004, Ken Fec started experimenting with the Atari 2600 and the Synthcart cartridge created by Paul Slocum. His music is a mixture of bass, acoustic guitar and Atari synth.

His first album, Extra Life, was reviewed by Aquarius Records, Empty Free and SCTAS, among others. Reviews for his second album, KONGMANIVONG, reached much broader horizons with MXDWN stating "Noise at its best!" and other reviews by Scratch Records, Music Geek and Punk News to name a few. In 2008, his song "Vile", from KONGMANIVONG, was positively reviewed by URB Magazine, who featured Power Pill Fist as an up-and-coming artist in their "Next 1000" article.

Power Pill Fist played at the South By Southwest music conference in 2007 and 2008, as well as the MACRoCk (Mid Atlantic Radio Conference) in 2009, in addition to extensively touring the United States.

Discography

Full-length albums

EP Versus series
For each disc in the "Versus" series, according to Power Pill Fist's official website, "an opponent challenges PPF to a live melodic duel which is cut down to a "best of" and released on 3" CD-R to only the first (100) fans."

References

External links
 Official site
 Graveface, Power Pill Fist's label
 URB Magazine Next 1000 for Power Pill Fist – Vile

Musical groups from Pittsburgh